Akhmatova may indicate:
Anna Akhmatova (1889 – 5 March 1966), Russian poet
Akhmatova (crater), Venus crater
3067 Akhmatova, asteroid